Item tree analysis (ITA) is a data analytical method which allows constructing a
hierarchical structure on the items of a questionnaire or test from observed response
patterns. Assume that we have a questionnaire with m items and that subjects can
answer positive (1) or negative (0) to each of these items, i.e. the items are
dichotomous. If n subjects answer the items this results in a binary data matrix D
with m columns and n rows.
Typical examples of this data format are test items which can be solved (1) or failed
(0) by subjects. Other typical examples are questionnaires where the items are
statements to which subjects can agree (1) or disagree (0).
Depending on the content of the items it is possible that the response of a subject to an
item j determines her or his responses to other items. It is, for example, possible that
each subject who agrees to item j will also agree to item i. In this case we say that
item j implies item i (short ). The goal of an ITA is to uncover such
deterministic implications from the data set D.

Algorithms for ITA 
ITA was originally developed by Van Leeuwe in 1974. The result of his algorithm,
which we refer in the following as Classical ITA, is a logically consistent set of
implications . Logically consistent means that if i implies j and j implies k then i implies k for each triple i, j, k of items. Thus the outcome of an ITA is a reflexive and transitive relation on the item set, i.e. a quasi-order on the items.
A different algorithm to perform an ITA was suggested in Schrepp (1999). This algorithm is called Inductive ITA. 
Classical ITA and inductive ITA both construct a quasi-order on the item set by explorative data analysis. But both methods use a different algorithm to construct this quasi-order. For a given data set the resulting quasi-orders from classical and inductive ITA will usually differ.
A detailed description of the algorithms used in classical and inductive ITA can be found in Schrepp (2003) or Schrepp (2006). In a recent paper (Sargin & Ünlü, 2009) some modifications to the algorithm of inductive ITA are proposed, which improve the ability of this method to detect the correct implications from data (especially in the case of higher random response error rates).

Relation to other methods 
ITA belongs to a group of data analysis methods called Boolean analysis of questionnaires.
Boolean analysis was introduced by Flament in 1976. The goal of a Boolean analysis is to
Since the basic work of Flament (1976) a number of different methods for boolean analysis
have been developed. See, for example, Van Buggenhaut and Degreef (1987), Duquenne (1987) or Theuns (1994).
These methods share the goal to derive deterministic dependencies between the items of a
questionnaire from data, but differ in the algorithms to reach this goal. A comparison of ITA
to other methods of boolean data analysis can be found in Schrepp (2003).

Applications 
There are several research papers available, which describe concrete applications of item tree analysis. 
Held and Korossy (1998) analyzes implications on a set of algebra problems with classical ITA. Item tree analysis is also used in a number of social science studies to get insight into the structure of dichotomous data. In Bart and Krus (1973), for example, a predecessor of ITA is used to establish a hierarchical order on items that describe socially unaccepted behavior. In Janssens (1999) a method of Boolean analysis is used to investigate the
integration process of minorities into the value system of the dominant culture. Schrepp describes several applications of inductive ITA in the analysis of dependencies between items of social science questionnaires.

Example of an application 
To show the possibilities of an analysis of a data set by ITA we analyse the statements of question 4 of the International Social Science Survey Programme (ISSSP) for the year 1995 by inductive and classical ITA.
The ISSSP is a continuing annual program of cross-national collaboration on surveys covering important topics for social science research. The program conducts each year one survey with comparable questions in each of the participating nations. The theme of the 1995 survey was national identity. We analyze the results for question 4 for the data set of Western Germany.
The statement for question 4 was:

Some people say the following things are important for being truly German. Others say they are not important. How important do you think each of the following is:
1. to have been born in Germany
2. to have German citizenship
3. to have lived in Germany for most of one’s life
4. to be able to speak German
5. to be a Christian
6. to respect Germany’s political institutions
7. to feel German

The subjects had the response possibilities Very important, Important, Not very important, Not important at all, and Can’t choose to answer the statements. 
To apply ITA to this data set we changed the answer categories. Very important and Important are coded as 1. Not very important and Not important at all are coded as 0. Can’t choose was handled as missing data. 

Available software 
The program ITA 2.0 implements both classical and inductive ITA.

See also
Item response theory

Notes

References
Bart, W. M., & Krus, D. J. (1973). An ordering-theoretic method to determine hierarchies among items. Educational and psychological measurement, 33, 291–300.
Duquenne V (1987). Conceptual Implications Between Attributes and some Representation Properties for Finite Lattices. In B Ganter, R Wille, K Wolfe (eds.), Beiträge zur Begriffsanalyse: Vorträge der Arbeitstagung Begriffsanalyse, Darmstadt 1986, pp. 313–339. Wissenschafts-Verlag, Mannheim.
Flament C (1976). L’Analyse Bool´eenne de Questionnaire. Mouton, Paris.
Held, T., & Korossy, K. (1998). Data-analysis as heuristic for establishing theoretically founded item structures. Zeitschrift für Psychologie, 206, 169–188.
Janssens, R. (1999). A Boolean approach to the measurement of group processes and attitudes. The concept of integration as an example. Mathematical Social Sciences, 38, 275–293.
Schrepp M (1999). On the Empirical Construction of Implications on Bi-valued Test Items. Mathematical Social Sciences, 38(3), 361–375.
Schrepp, M (2002). Explorative analysis of empirical data by boolean analysis of questionnaires. Zeitschrift für Psychologie, 210/2, S. 99-109.
Schrepp, M. (2003). A method for the analysis of hierarchical dependencies between items of a questionnaire. Methods of Psychological Research, 19, 43–79.
Schrepp, M. (2006). ITA 2.0: A program for Classical and Inductive Item Tree Analysis. Journal of Statistical Software, Vol. 16, Issue 10.
Schrepp, M. (2006). Properties of the correlational agreement coefficient: A comment to Ünlü & Albert (2004). Mathematical Social Science, Vol. 51, Issue 1, 117–123.
Schrepp, M. (2007). On the evaluation of fit measures for quasi-orders. Mathematical Social Sciences Vol. 53, Issue 2, 196–208.
Theuns P (1994). A Dichotomization Method for Boolean Analysis of Quantifiable Cooccurence Data. In G Fischer, D Laming (eds.), Contributions to Mathematical Psychology, Psychometrics and Methodology, Scientific Psychology Series, pp. 173–194. Springer-Verlag, New York.
Ünlü, A., & Albert, D. (2004). The Correlational Agreement Coefficient CA - a mathematical analysis of a descriptive goodness-of-fit measure. Mathematical Social Sciences, 48, 281–314.
Van Buggenhaut J, Degreef E (1987). On Dichotomization Methods in Boolean Analysis of Questionnaires. In E Roskam, R Suck (eds.), Mathematical Psychology in Progress, Elsevier Science Publishers B.V., North Holland.
Van Leeuwe, J.F.J. (1974). Item tree analysis. Nederlands Tijdschrift voor de Psychologie, 29, 475–484.
Sargin, A., & Ünlü, A. (2009). Inductive item tree analysis: Corrections, improvements, and comparisons. Mathematical Social Sciences, 58, 376–392.

Data analysis
Types of polling
Sampling (statistics)